The Collectors was a Canadian psychedelic rock band active in the 1960s.

History
The Collectors debuted in Vancouver, British Columbia, in 1961 as a house band (the C-FUN Classics) for CFUN radio, and renamed itself The Collectors in 1966.  The band featured Howie Vickers (Howard Vickberg) on lead vocals, Bill Henderson on lead guitar, recorder, keyboards, and lead vocals (these last mostly on Grass and Wild Strawberries), Claire Lawrence on tenor saxophone, harmonica, keyboards, flute, organ, recorder, and vocals, Glenn Miller on bass and vocals, and Ross Turney on drums and percussion.

The Collectors' biggest hit was their first single, 'Looking at a Baby', released in March 1967 on the Valiant label in the U.S. and on New Syndrome in Canada.  It reached #4 on Toronto's CHUM-AM on April 24, 1967.  Valiant was then acquired by Warner Bros. Records.  In 1967 the group released its first album. The Collectors, on the Warner Bros.-Seven Arts label and appeared on sessions for the US group The Electric Prunes' album Mass in F Minor.

In the fall of 1968 they released Grass and Wild Strawberries. The lyrics of this album were written by Canadian poet and playwright George Ryga ("The Ecstasy of Rita Joe") complemented by the music of The Collectors. Between 1968 and 1969 the group composed soundtracks to three Canadian films: "Don't Let The Angels Fall," (1968) "Canada The Land," (1969) and "The Land" (1969). The Collectors also appeared on the CBC national television program Let's Go.

Howie Vickers left the group in 1969, and the remaining members of the band reconstituted themselves as Chilliwack, with Bill Henderson taking over lead vocals.

Discography
 1967 Looking at a Baby (Vickberg-Henderson) A-side; Old Man (Vickberg-Lawrence-Henderson) B-side; 45 RPM single
 1968 The Collectors
 1969 Grass and Wild Strawberries
 1970 I Must Have Been Blind A-side; The Beginning B-side; 45 RPM single release (never compiled on an album)

Singles

References

External links
Archive website
 
 

Musical groups established in 1961
Musical groups disestablished in 1969
Musical groups from Vancouver
Canadian psychedelic rock music groups
1961 establishments in British Columbia
1969 disestablishments in British Columbia